The tournament Most Outstanding Player is an annual award given out at the conclusion of the NCAA women's ice hockey tournament to the player to be judged the most outstanding. The award has been in effect since the adoption of a national championship tournament for the 2000–01 season.

History
Only one winner did not play for the National Champion, Kristy Zamora in 2002. Only one player has been named MOP more than once, Noora Räty in 2012 and 2013. In 2011 the MOP was awarded to multiple players for the first time when it was awarded to Meghan Duggan and Hilary Knight.

The 2020 tournament was cancelled due to the COVID-19 pandemic, as a result no tournament Most Outstanding Player was awarded.

Most Outstanding Player

Note: * Recipient did not play for the National Champion

Award breakdown

References

External links
  NCAA Division I women ice hockey page
 NCAA Ice Hockey, Division I Women's Records

Most Outstanding Player
College women's ice hockey in the United States